The "Tuffeau" de Saint-Omer is a geologic formation in northern France. The sandstones of the formation, named after Saint-Omer, preserve bird and primate fossils dating back to the middle Thanetian age of the Paleocene epoch of the Paleogene period, dating to about 58 Ma. 

The European land mammal age, a continental biostratigraphic zonation for the Cenozoic, as ammonites for the Mesozoic and conodonts for the Paleozoic, classification starts after this age, the Thanetian is correlative with the MP2 to 5 of the Mammal Paleogene zone of Europe.

The formation is locally referred to and geologically known as tuff, although the lithology of the formation is glauconitic sandstone, deposited in a shallow marine environment at the southernmost edge of the North Sea Graben.

Description 
The Tuffeau de Saint-Omer is described as a glauconitic well-sorted sandstone, with opal cement and the invertebrate fossils Pholadomya cuneata, P. konincki, Cyprina morrisi, Thracia prestwichi, Natica deshayesiana and Martesia cuneata. The Tuffeau is exposed near Molinghem and Doulac, north of Saint-Omer, after which the formation is named. Despite the siliciclastic lithology, the formation is locally referred to as "tuff"; volcaniclastic rock.

Fossil content 
At Templeuve, the following fossils were reported:

Primates
 Berruvius cf. lasseroni
 Sarnacius aff. gingerichi

Birds
 Lithornithidae indet.
 Pelagornithidae indet.

See also 
 List of fossiliferous stratigraphic units in France
 Cerrejón Formation, contemporaneous fossiliferous formation in Colombia
 Itaboraí Formation, contemporaneous fossiliferous formation in Brazil
 European land mammal age

References

Bibliography 
 
 
 

Geologic formations of France
Paleogene France
Paleocene Series of Europe
Thanetian Stage
Sandstone formations
Shallow marine deposits
Fossiliferous stratigraphic units of Europe
Paleontology in France
Formations
Formations